The hybrid cultivar Ulmus × hollandica 'Fjerrestad' is one of a number of cultivars arising from the crossing of the Wych Elm U. glabra with a variety of Field Elm U. minor. The tree was first mentioned in Mededeeling, Comite inzake Bestudeering en Bestrijding van de Iepenziekte 13: 9, 1933, but without description.

Description
None available.

Cultivation
No specimens are known to survive.

Etymology
The clone is named for the village of Fjärrestad in Skåne between Landskrona and Helsingborg, Sweden.

Hybrid cultivars
'Fjerrestad' was crossed with Ulmus × hollandica and U. minor in the Dutch elm breeding programme before World War II, but none of the progeny were of particular note and were discarded.

References

Dutch elm cultivar
Ulmus articles missing images
Ulmus
Missing elm cultivars